Circobotys aurealis is a moth in the family Crambidae. It was described by John Henry Leech in 1889. It is found in Japan and Taiwan.

References

Moths described in 1889
Pyraustinae